The Stockhorn (3,212 m) is a mountain of the Bernese Alps, located north of Baltschieder in the canton of Valais. It overlooks the Baltschiedertal and lies south of the Bietschhorn.

On the south side of the mountain is located the Stockhornbiwak (2,598 m), a mountain shelter operated by the Swiss Alpine Club.

References

External links
Stockhorn on Hikr
Stockhorn on Summitpost

Mountains of the Alps
Alpine three-thousanders
Bernese Alps
Mountains of Valais
Mountains of Switzerland